Haji Abdul Sattar Bachani is a Pakistani politician who had been a member of the National Assembly of Pakistan, from June 2013 to May 2018.

Political career

He was elected to the National Assembly of Pakistan as a candidate of Pakistan Peoples Party (PPP) from Constituency NA-223 (Tando Allahyar-cum-Matiari) in 2013 Pakistani general election. He received 91,956 votes and defeated Rahila Gul Magsi, a candidate of Pakistan Muslim League (N) (PML-N).

References

Living people
Pakistan People's Party politicians
Pakistani MNAs 2013–2018
People from Sindh
Year of birth missing (living people)